History and Memory: For Akiko and Takashige is a 1991 documentary film by Rea Tajiri. In her film, Tajiri recalls her family's experience of the American internment of the Japanese during World War II.

History and Memory explores the story beyond the recorded history of the internment of the Japanese and Japanese Americans. The film premiered at the 1991 Whitney Biennial exhibition, and has since been screened over 250 times.

The Film
Tajiri presents collective history from mainstream mediums, whilst presenting her own history through the memory of real people. To create her own personal history, Tajiri utilizes memory through her family members' experiences, along with photographs and 8mm footage. She also uses mainstream mediums such as, newsreels, Hollywood feature film, and government propaganda.

Awards

1991: Distinguished Achievement Award from the International Documentary Association (Whitney Biennial, World Premiere)
1992: Special Jury Prize: "New Visions Category" (San Francisco International Film Festival)
1992: Best Experimental Video (Atlanta Film and Video Festival)
Named one of the Top 100 American Films by Women Directors

Screenings
All screenings below can be found on the Rea Tajiri Website.

2003-06:
Southern Connecticut State, Asian & Pacific Women Studies Conference
Only Skin Deep: Changing Visions of the American Self, ICP, New York

1992-93:
Carnegie Museum of Art, Pittsburgh, PA
International Documentary Association Congress, Los Angeles, CA
Japan: Inside, Outside, In Between, Artists Space, NYC
National Educational Film & Video Festival, Oakland, CA
Relocations & Revisions: The Japanese-American Internment Reconsidered, Long
Beach Museum of Art
Francisco International Film Festival, San Francisco, CA
University Art Museum, Pacific Film Archives, Berkeley, CA
Human Rights Watch Festival, NY
Atlanta Film and Video Festival
Film &Video Festival, Toronto CANADA
Independent Eye, Broadcast KCET, Los Angeles
Rotterdam Film & Video Festival, Rotterdam NETHERLANDS
Berlin Film Festival, Berlin W. Germany
Saratoga Public Library, Saratoga NY
Videoscape, Asian Cinevision/ CUNY TV, NY
50 Years of Remembrance: Center for New Television, Chicago, IL
Asian American Studies Presentation, Univ of Wisconsin Madison
Program for African Studies, Northwestern University, Evanston IL
Columbia College, Chicago, IL
A Question of Culture: Interrogating Identity, Madison Art Center, Madison WI
University of California Los Angeles, Asian American Film Classroom, Los Angeles, CA
Asian American Film and Video Festival, NAATA, Berkeley CA
The Asian American Experience, Walker Center, Minneapolis MIN
Visible Women, Cycles of Identity, Hallwalls Squeaky Wheel, Buffalo NY
Committed Visions, Museum of Modern Art, NY
Video and Sound: Video Viewpoints series, Museum of Modern Art, NY
Viper Video Festival, Switzerland
New York Center for Urban Folklore, NY
Women's Media Project, Texas
Women In the Directors Chair Festival
Vancouver Art Gallery, Vancouver British Columbia
Finnish Film Festival
Asian American Women Filmmakers, Wesleyan University, CT
University of Chicago, Chicago IL
Society for Cinema Studies Conference, PA
Danish Film Inst Workshop, Kobenhaven, DENMARK
Territory Series, Laguna Gloria Art Museum, Austin TX
European Media Arts Festival, Frankfurt Main GERMANY
University of Oklahoma, School of Art
Blackburst, Universitat Salzburg Inst for Publizistik/Kommunciations
Experimental 92 Filmclub Xenix,
University of Arizona, Phoenix
University of Hawaii at Maui
Franklin and Eleanor Roosevelt Library, NY

1991:
Hawaii Intl. Film Festival
Yamagata International Documentary Film Festival
Columbia University, NY
Pearl Harbor Symposium, Japan Society, NY
The Hybrid State Films, Exit Art and Anthology Film Archives, NY
Recent Works by Rea Tajiri, SAW Video Gallery Co-Op, Ontario CANADA
Festival D'Ammiens, Ammiens FRANCE
Triply Split: Subject Bound Three Part, Long Beach Museum of Art
Independent Feature Project, NY
Syracuse University, NY
New Works by and About Asian American Women, LACE and Visual Communications,
Los Angeles, CA
Cultural Transitions: Randolph Street Gallery, Chicago IL
AFI Video Festival, Los Angeles, CA
Viper Video Festival, Lucerne SWITZERLAND
Robert Flaherty Seminar, Aurora NY
Whitney Biennial, Whitney Museum of American Art, NY
Race to the Screen, The Euclid Toronto Canada

Reviews
 "Tajiri approaches her subject like a poet. She weaves together images and allows them to enrich one another in skewed and subtle ways as their resonances slowly emerge." (Caryn James, New York Times)
 American Historical Review Review by Kathleen Hulser
 New York Times Review by Sarah Ing
 Los Angeles Times Review by Robert Koehler

References

External links 
 Rea Tajiri Official Website

1991 films
1991 documentary films
American documentary films
Documentary films about the internment of Japanese Americans
1990s English-language films
1990s American films